Mount Marvel is a mountain,  high, standing  south of Escalade Peak in the Van Allen Range, near the head of Mulock Glacier in Antarctica. It was named by the Advisory Committee on Antarctic Names in 1964 for Commander R. Marvel, U.S. Navy, officer in charge of Detachment Alpha at McMurdo Station in 1963.

References

Mountains of Oates Land